This is a list of members of the Swiss Council of States of the 49th legislature (2011-2015). Most members were elected in the 2011 election.

Current members

Notes and references

See also
 Political parties of Switzerland for the abbreviations
 List of members of the Swiss Council of States (2003-2007)
 List of members of the Swiss Council of States (2007-2011)
 Presidents of the Council of States
 List of members of the Swiss National Council

2011